Rønland Offshore Wind Farm is a nearshore wind farm in the westmost part of Limfjorden, Denmark. It was commissioned in 2003 and consists of four 2 MW Vestas wind turbines and four 2.3 MW ones from Bonus/Siemens.

See also

Wind power in Denmark
List of offshore wind farms in Denmark

References 

Wind farms in Denmark
Energy infrastructure completed in 2003
2003 establishments in Denmark